Chegemsky District (Çegem rayon) is an administrative and a municipal district (raion), one of the ten in the Kabardino-Balkar Republic, Russia. It is located in the central and southwestern parts of the republic. Its administrative center is the town of Chegem. As of the 2010 Census, the total population of the district was 69,092, with the population of Chegem accounting for 26.1% of that number.

Administrative and municipal status
Within the framework of administrative divisions, Chegemsky District is one of the ten in the Kabardino-Balkaianr Republic and has administrative jurisdiction over one town (Chegem) and twelve rural localities. As a municipal division, the district is incorporated as Chegemsky Municipal District. The town of Chegem is incorporated as an urban settlement and the twelve rural localities are incorporated into nine rural settlements within the municipal district. The town of Chegem serves as the administrative center of both the administrative and municipal district.

References

Notes

Sources

Districts of Kabardino-Balkaria
